Numerous castles can be found in the German state of Baden-Württemberg. These buildings, some of which have a history of over 1000 years, were the setting of historical events, domains of famous personalities and are still imposing buildings to this day.

This list encompasses castles described in German as Burg (castle), Festung (fort/fortress), Schloss (manor house) and Palais/Palast (palace). Many German castles after the middle ages were mainly built as royal or ducal palaces rather than as fortified buildings.

Stuttgart

Stuttgart

Landkreis Böblingen 
 Schloss Leonberg, Leonberg
 Schloss Waldenbuch, Waldenbuch

Landkreis Esslingen 
 Burgruine Diepoldsburg (Obere Diepoldsburg & Burgruine Rauber), Gde. Lenningen
 Burgruine Grötzingen, commune of Aichtal-Grötzingen
 Burgruine Hahnenkamm, commune of Bissingen an der Teck
 Burgruine Heimenstein, commune of Neidlingen
 Burgruine Hohengutenberg, commune of Lenningen-Gutenberg
 Hohenneuffen Castle, commune of Neuffen
 Schloss Kirchheim (Teck), commune of Kirchheim unter Teck
 Burgruine Lichteneck (Esslingen), commune of Weilheim/Teck
 Ruine Lichtenstein, commune of Neidlingen
 Burgruine Limburg, commune of Weilheim/Teck
 Burg Neuenriet, commune of Altenriet
 Burgruine Randeck, commune of Weilheim/Teck
 Burgruine Reußenstein, commune of Neidlingen
 Burgruine Schanbach, commune of Aichwald-Schanbach
 Burgruine Sperberseck, commune of Lenningen
 Burgruine Sulzburg, commune of Lenningen 
 Teck Castle, commune of Owen
 Burgruine Turmberg (Aichelberg), commune of Aichelberg
 Burgruine Wielandstein, commune of Lenningen
 Burgruine Wuelstein, commune of Lenningen-Gutenberg

Landkreis Göppingen 
 Schloss Filseck, Uhingen
 Helfenstein Castle, Geislingen an der Steige
 Hiltenburg Castle, Bad Ditzenbach
 Hohenstaufen Castle, Göppingen
 Landsöhr Castle, Bad Boll (burgstall)
 Leimburg Castle, Gruibingen/Auendorf
 Ramsberg Castle, Donzdorf
 Staufeneck Castle, Salach
 Wäscherschloss, Wäschenbeuren
 Schloss Weißenstein, Lauterstein

Landkreis Ludwigsburg 
 
 Favorite Castle, Ludwigsburg
 Ludwigsburg Palace, Ludwigsburg
 Monrepos Palace, Ludwigsburg
 Festung Hohenasperg, Asperg
 Nippenburg, Schwieberdingen
 Burg Lichtenberg, Oberstenfeld
 Burg Alt-Sachsenheim, Sachsenheim
 Schaubeck Castle, Steinheim an der Murr, Kleinbottwar

Rems-Murr-Kreis 
 Alfdorf Manor

Heilbronn 
 Trappenseeschlösschen
 Deutschordensschloss Kirchhausen, Kirchhausen

Landkreis Heilbronn 

 Schloss Affaltrach, Obersulm-Affaltrach
 Schloss Assumstadt, Möckmühl-Züttlingen
 Schlössle Auenstein, Ilsfeld-Auenstein
 Schloss Babstadt, Bad Rappenau-Babstadt
 Wasserschloss Bad Rappenau, Bad Rappenau
 Burg Blankenhorn, Güglingen-Eibensbach
 Oberes Schloss Bonfeld, Bad Rappenau-Bonfeld
 Schloss Brackenheim, Brackenheim
 Schloss Bürg, Neuenstadt am Kocher-Bürg
 Schlösschen Brettach, Langenbrettach-Brettach
 Schloss Domeneck, Möckmühl-Züttlingen
 Burg Duttenberg, Bad Friedrichshall-Duttenberg
 Burg Ehrenberg, Bad Rappenau-Heinsheim
 Ottilienberg, Eppingen
 Schloss Eschenau, Eschenau
 Schloss Fürfeld, Bad Rappenau-Fürfeld
 Unteres Schloss Gemmingen, Gemmingen
 Greckenschloss Kochendorf, Bad Friedrichshall-Kochendorf
 Schloss Grombach, Bad Rappenau-Grombach
 Schloss Heinsheim, Bad Rappenau-Heinsheim
 Burgruine Helfenberg, Ilsfeld-Auenstein
 Burgruine Heriboldisburg, Neudenau-Herbolzheim
 Schloss Heuchlingen, Bad Friedrichshall-Heuchlingen
 Hohenbeilstein, Beilstein
 Schloss Horneck, Gundelsheim
 Schloss Ittlingen, Ittlingen
 Götzenburg Jagsthausen, Jagsthausen
 Rotes Schloss Jagsthausen, Jagsthausen
 Weißes Schloss Jagsthausen, Jagsthausen
 Wasserburg Lauffen, Lauffen am Neckar
 Wasserschloss Lautereck, Löwenstein-Teusserbad
 Schloss Lehen, Bad Friedrichshall-Kochendorf
 Schloss Lehrensteinsfeld, Lehrensteinsfeld
 Schloss Liebenstein, Neckarwestheim
 Burgruine Löwenstein, Löwenstein
 Schloss Magenheim, Cleebronn
 Burg Maienfels, Wüstenrot-Maienfels
 Schloss Massenbach, Schwaigern-Massenbach
 Schloss Michelbach, Zaberfeld-Michelbach
 Burg Möckmühl, Möckmühl
 Deutschordensschloss Neckarsulm, Neckarsulm
 Burg Neipperg, Brackenheim-Neipperg
 Schloss Neudenau, Neudenau
 Schloss Neuenstadt, Neuenstadt am Kocher
 Schloss Obergimpern, Bad Rappenau-Obergimpern
 Burg Ochsenburg, Zaberfeld-Ochsenburg
 Bautzenschloss Oedheim, Oedheim
 Schloss Presteneck, Neuenstadt am Kocher-Stein am Kocher
 Schloss Rohrbach, Eppingen-Rohrbach am Gießhübel
 Schloss Schomberg, Gemmingen-Stebbach
 Schloss Schwaigern, Schwaigern
 Schloss Siegelsbach, Siegelsbach
 St. Andrésches Schlösschen, Bad Friedrichshall-Kochendorf
 Stettenfels Castle, Untergruppenbach
 Schloss Stocksberg, Brackenheim-Stockheim
 Burg Streichenberg, Gemmingen-Stebbach
 Oberes Schloss Talheim, Talheim
 Unteres Schloss Talheim, Talheim
 Schloss Weiler, Obersulm-Weiler
 Burgruine Weibertreu, Weinsberg
 Schloss Widdern, Widdern
 Burg Wildeck, Abstatt
 Schloss Zaberfeld, Zaberfeld

Hohenlohekreis 
 Burgruine Lichteneck (Hohenlohekresis), Ingelfingen
 Schloss Neuenstein, Neuenstein
 Schloss Waldenburg, Waldenburg, Baden-Württemberg

Main-Tauber-Kreis 

 Deutschordensschloss Mergentheim, Bad Mergentheim
 Freudenberg Castle, Freudenberg 
 Gamburg Castle, Gamburg 
 Neuhaus Castle, Igersheim
 Weikersheim Castle, Weikersheim
 Wertheim Castle, Wertheim

Landkreis Schwäbisch Hall 
 Alt-Bartenstein Castle, Schrozberg-Riedbach
 Wasserburg Altenhausen, Schwäbisch Hall-Altenhausen
 Altes Schloss (Gaildorf), Gaildorf
 Amlishagen Castle, Gerabronn
 Bachenstein Castle, Schrozberg-Bartenstein
 Schloss Bartenstein, Schrozberg-Bartenstein
 Burgruine Bebenburg, Rot am See-Kleinbrettheim
 Schlossruine Bielriet, Schwäbisch Hall-Wolpertsdorf
 Schloss Braunsbach, Braunsbach
 Burg Buch, Schwäbisch Hall-Buch
 Burgruine Buchhorn, Michelbach an der Bilz
 Schloss Burleswagen, Satteldorf-Burleswagen
 Schloss Döttingen, Braunsbach-Döttingen
 Burg Eichholz, Schrozberg-Eichholz
 Wasserschloss Eltershofen, Schwäbisch Hall-Eltershofen
 Burg Enningen, Braunsbach
 Eulenburg Castle, Crailsheim-Auhof
 Wasserburg Flügelau Crailsheim-Roßfeld
 Burg Flyhöhe, Blaufelden
 Schloss Gammesfeld, Blaufelden-Gammesfeld
 Burgruine Geyersburg, Schwäbisch Hall-Gelbingen
 Schloss Gröningen, Satteldorf-Gröningen
 Burg Haßfelden, Wolpertshausen-Haßfelden
 Wasserschloss Herboldshausen, Kirchberg-Herboldshausen
 Burg Herrentierbach, Blaufelden-Herrentierbach
 Hertenstein Castle, Blaufelden-Billingsbach
 Wasserschloss Honhardt, Frankenhardt
 Burg Hohenkressberg, Kressberg-Hohenkressberg
 Burgruine Hohenstatt (Hohenstadt), Schwäbisch Hall-Neunbronn
 Burgruine Hohenstadt, Schwäbisch Hall-Neunbronn
 Burgruine Hohenstein, Schwäbisch Hall-Hohenstadt
 Burgruine Hopfach
 Hornberg Castle (Hornberg an der Jagst), Kirchberg an der Jagst
 Burg Katzenstein, Langenburg-Hürden
 Schloss Kirchberg, Kirchberg an der Jagst
 Burgruine Klingenfels, Ilshofen-Steinbächle
 Wasserburg Kottspiel, Bühlertann-Kottspiel
 Burgruine Kranzberg, Sulzbach-Laufen
 Schloss Langenburg, Langenburg
 Burgruine Leofels, Ilshofen
 Burgruine Limpurg, Schwäbisch Hall
 Burg Lobenhausen, Kirchberg-Lobenhausen
 Burg Lohr, Jagstheim-Lohr
 Burgruine Löwenburg, Braunsbach-Bühlerzimmern
 Schloss Michelbach, Michelbach an der Bilz
 Schloss Morstein, Gerabronn
 Burgruine Neuberg , Vellberg-Talheim
 Neuburg, Schwäbisch Hall-Gelbingen
 Schloss Obersontheim, Obersontheim
 Pfannenburg, Jagstheim
 Wasserburg Ramsbach, Schwäbisch Hall-Ramsbach
 Rappenburg, Stimpfach
 Schloss Rechenberg, Stimpfach
 Burg Riedbach , Schrozberg-Riedbach
 Burg Rötenberg, Fichtenberg-Mittelrot
 Schloss Schmiedelfeld, Sulzbach-Laufen
 Burg Schönebürg, Crailsheim-Goldbach
 Schloss Schrozberg, Schrozberg
 Schrozburg, Schrozberg
 Suhlburg, Untermünkheim-Suhlburg
 Tannenburg, Bühlertann-Tannenburg
 Schloss Tierberg, Braunsbach-Tierberg
 Wasserburg Untermünkheim, Untermünkheim
 Burg Unterscheffach, Wolpertshausen-Unterscheffach
 Burgstall Unterscheffach , Wolpertshausen-Unterscheffach
 Wasserburg Unterscheffach, Wolpertshausen-Unterscheffach
 Schloss Vellberg, Vellberg
 Burgruine Werdeck, Rot am See-Werdeck
 Schloss Wildenstein, Fichtenau
 Burg Wolkenstein, Sulzbach-Laufen-Altschmiedelfeld

Landkreis Heidenheim 
 Ballmertshofen Castle, Dischingen
 Brenz Castle, Brenz an der Brenz
 Schlössle, Brenz an der Brenz
 Burgstall Burstel (Sontheim an der Brenz), Sontheim an der Brenz
 Jagdschloss Duttenstein, Dischingen
 Eselsburg Castle, Herbrechtingen
 Falkenstein Castle, Gerstetten
 Güssenburg Castle, Hermaringen
 Hellenstein Castle, Heidenheim an der Brenz
 Hurwang Castle, Heidenheim an der Brenz
 Kaltenburg Castle, Niederstotzingen
 Katzenstein Castle, Dischingen
 Schloss Niederstotzingen, Niederstotzingen
 Schloss Oberstotzingen, Niederstotzingen
 Schloss Schnaitheim, Heidenheim an der Brenz
 Schloss Stetten ob Lontal, Niederstotzingen
 Schloss Taxis, Dischingen

Ostalbkreis 
 Aalenkastell, Aalen
 Schloss Adelmannsfelden, Adelmannsfelden
 Alte Bürg, Riesbürg-Utzmemmingen, Reste der Burganlage
 Schloss Baldern (Hohenbaldern), Bopfingen-Baldern
 Schloss Böbingen, Böbingen an der Rems
 Schloss Dambach, Stödtlen-Dambach
 Schloss Dorotheenhof (Oberburg, Oberes Schloss, Degenfeld'sches Schlösschen), Essingen (Württemberg)
 Schloss Ellwangen, Ellwangen (Jagst)
 Schloss Essingen (Degenfeldsches Schloss), Essingen (Württemberg)
 Schloss Essingen, Essingen (Württemberg)
 Schloss Essingen (Unteres Schloss, Woellwarther Schloss), Essingen (Württemberg)
 Schloss Fachsenfeld, Aalen-Fachsenfeld
 Flochberg Castle, Bopfingen-Flochberg
 Gromberg Castle, Lauchheim, ruins (surviving: bergfried, shield wall)
 Schloss Heubach, Heubach
 Hohenalfingen Castle, Aalen-Hohenalfingen, Ruine (surviving: remains of the bergfried, remains of the mantlet wall)
 Burg Hohenrechberg (Rechberg), Schwäbisch Gmünd-Rechberg, Ruine (erhalten: Umfassungsmauern, Torbau)
 Schloss Hohenroden (Roden, Alt Roden), Essingen (Württemberg)-Hohenroden
 Schloss Hohenstadt, Abtsgmünd-Hohenstadt
 Schloss Kapfenburg, Lauchheim
 Schloss Laubach, Abtsgmünd-Laubach
 Lauterburg Castle, Essingen-Lauterburg
 Turmhügelburg Leinroden (Roden), Abtsgmünd-Leinroden, Turmhügelburg der Stauferzeit
 Schloss Leinzell (Langsches Schloss), Leinzell
 Schloss Lindach (Neulaymingen), Schwäbisch Gmünd-Lindach
 Schloss Neubronn, Abtsgmünd-Neubronn
 Niederalfingen Castle (Marienburg, Fuggerschloss), Hüttlingen (Württemberg)-Niederalfingen
 Rosenstein Castle, Heubach 
 Schloss Schechingen, Schechingen
 Schenkenstein Castle, Bopfingen-Aufhausen, Ruine (erhalten: Bergfried, Mauerreste)
 Schloss Tannhausen, Tannhausen
 Schloss Untergröningen, Untergröningen
 Schloss Unterschneidheim, Unterschneidheim, remains of an old Teutonic Order castle
 Schloss Utzmemmingen (Vohenstein'sches Schloss), Riesbürg-Utzmemmingen
 Schloss Wagenhofen, Westhausen (Württemberg)
 Waldau Castle, Schwäbisch Gmünd-Waldau
 Schloss Wasseralfingen, Aalen-Wasseralfingen
 Wöllstein Castle (Wöllstein), Abtsgmünd, ruins (surviving chapel)
 Schloss Wört (Werde, Wörth), Wört
 Stolch'sches Schloss, (Trochtelfingen, Teilort von) Bopfingen

Karlsruhe

Baden-Baden 
 Neues Schloss Baden-Baden 
 Schloss Hohenbaden (Altes Schloss)
 Yburg, Neuweier
 Alt-Eberstein Castle, Ebersteinburg
 Schloss Seelach
 Cäcilienberg Castle
 Schloss Neuweier, Neuweier
 Baden-Baden Hunting Lodge

Karlsruhe 
 Schloss Augustenburg
 Schloss Gottesaue
 Schloss Karlsburg 
 Karlsruhe Palace
 Gut Scheibenhardt

Landkreis Karlsruhe 
 Schloss Bruchsal, Bruchsal
 Schloss Ettlingen, Ettlingen
 Schloss Gochsheim, Kraichtal
 Schloss Kislau, Bad Schönborn
 Burg Ravensburg, Sulzfeld (Baden)
 Schloss Stutensee, Stutensee
 Waldenfels Castle, Malsch

Landkreis Rastatt 
 Old Windeck Castle, Bühl
 Schloss Bach, Bühl
 Schloss Favorite (Rastatt), Rastatt
 Schloss Neusatz, Bühl
 Pagodenburg, Rastatt
 Schloss Rastatt, Rastatt
 Schloss Rittersbach, Bühl

Heidelberg 
 Heidelberg Castle
 Handschuhsheim Castle (Tiefburg)
 Schloss Rohrbach

Mannheim 
 Eichelsheim Castle
 Mannheim Palace
 Bretzenheim Palace
 Schloss Seckenheim

Neckar-Odenwald-Kreis 
 Dauchstein Castle, Binau
 Guttenberg Castle, Haßmersheim
 Schloss Hardheim, Hardheim
 Hornberg Castle, Neckarzimmern
 Lohrbach Castle, Mosbach
 Minneburg, Neckargerach
 Schweinberg Castle, Hardheim
 Zwingenberg Castle, Zwingenberg

Rhein-Neckar-Kreis 
 Dilsberg Fortress, Neckargemünd
 Eberbach Castle, Eberbach 
 Hirschburg Castle, Hirschberg an der Bergstraße
 Reichenstein Castle, Neckargemünd
 Schauenburg Castle, Dossenheim
 Schwetzingen Castle, Schwetzingen
 Steinsberg Castle, Sinsheim
 Stolzeneck Castle, Eberbach 
 Strahlenburg, Schriesheim
 Wachenburg, Weinheim
 Weinheimer Schloss, Weinheim
 Windeck Castle, Weinheim
 Neidenstein Fortress, Neidenstein

Landkreis Calw 
 Hunting lodge of Hirsau Abbey, Calw
 Hohennagold Castle, Nagold
 Liebenzell Castle, Bad Liebenzell
 Zavelstein Castle, Bad Teinach-Zavelstein
 Waldeck Ruins, Calw

Pforzheim 
 Kräheneck Castle
 Rabeneck Castle
 Liebeneck Castle

Enzkreis 
 Schloss Neuenbürg, Neuenbürg
 Straubenhardt Castle, Neuenbürg
 Waldenburg Castle, Neuenbürg

Landkreis Freudenstadt 
 Schloss Mühringen, Horb
 Rinkenwall, Baiersbronn
 Tannenfels Castle, Mitteltal

Freiburg

Freiburg im Breisgau 
 Colombischlößle
 Schloss Ebnet
 Schneeburg
 Zähringen Castle

Landkreis Breisgau-Hochschwarzwald 
 Alt-Urach Castle, Lenzkirch
 Baden Castle/Badenweiler Castle, Badenweiler
 Falkenstein Castle, Buchenbach
 Hauenfels Castle, Ehrenstetten
 Höhingen Castle, Achkarren
 Jesuitenschloss, Merzhausen
 Malteserschloss, Heitersheim
 Neuenfels Castle, Müllheim (Baden)
 Staufen Castle, Staufen im Breisgau
 Wiesneck Castle, Buchenbach-Wiesneck

Landkreis Emmendingen 
 Unteres Schloss Hecklingen, Kenzingen
 Altes Schloss Heimbach, Teningen
 Neues Schloss Heimbach, Teningen
 Burgruine Hochburg, Emmendingen
 Kastelburg, Waldkirch 
 Landeck Castle, Emmendingen
 Lichteneck Castle, Kenzingen
 Markgrafenschloss, Emmendingen
 Schwarzenburg, Waldkirch
 Sponeck Castle, Jechtingen

Ortenaukreis 
 Ruine Alt-Geroldseck (Rauhkasten), Schönberg (Gemeinde Seelbach)
 Schloss Dautenstein, Seelbach 
 Hohengeroldseck Castle, Seelbach 
 Schloss Hornberg, Hornberg 
 Husen Castle, Hausach
 Lützelhardt Castle, Seelbach
 Mahlberg Castle, Mahlberg
 Schloss Ortenberg, Ortenberg
 Schauenburg, Oberkirch 
 Schloss Wolfach, Wolfach
 Wolfach Castle, Oberwolfach
 Neu-Windeck Castle, Lauf

Landkreis Rottweil 
 Albeck Castle, Sulz am Neckar
 Falkenstein Castle, Schramberg
 Wasserschloss Glatt in Glatt (Stadt Sulz am Neckar)
 Herrenzimmern Castle, Bösingen
 Hohenschramberg Castle, Schramberg
 Lichtenfels Castle, Dornhan
 Schloss Leinstetten, Leinstetten
 Schloss Lichtenegg in Harthausen (Gemeinde Epfendorf)
 Schenkenburg, Schenkenzell
 Schiltach Castle, Schiltach
 Schilteck Castle, Schramberg
 Wehrstein Castle in Fischingen (Stadt Sulz am Neckar)
 Willenburg, Schiltach

Schwarzwald-Baar-Kreis 
 Bärenberg Castle (Weiberzahn), Königsfeld im Schwarzwald
 Burgberg Castle, Königsfeld im Schwarzwald
 Entenburg Castle, Donaueschingen-Pfohren
 Granegg Castle, Niedereschach
 Waldau Castle, Königsfeld im Schwarzwald

Landkreis Tuttlingen 
 Altfridingen Castle, Fridingen an der Donau
 Altrietheim Castle, Rietheim-Weilheim
 Bachtal Castle, Buchheim
 Baldenberg Castle, Spaichingen
 Bärenthal Castle, Bärenthal
 Burgstall Castle, Fridingen an der Donau
 Burgstallhöhle Castle, Fridingen an der Donau
 Bräunisburg Castle, Mühlheim
 Schloss Bronnen, Fridingen an der Donau
 Deilingen Castle, Deilingen
 Emmingen Castle, Emmingen-Liptingen
 Espach Castle, Mühlheim
 Fürstenstein Castle, Rietheim-Weihlheim
 Granegg Castle, Egesheim
 Höhle im Kaiserstandsfelsen, Buchheim
 Honberg Castle, Tuttlingen
 Hohenkarpfen, Hausen ob Verena
 Kallenberg Castle, Buchheim
 Schloss Immendingen, Immendingen
 Hewenegg Castle, Immendingen
 Konzenberg Castle, Wurmlingen 
 Kraftstein Castle, Mühlheim
 Krinnerfels Castle, Fridingen an der Donau
 Lengenfels Castle, Bärenthal
 Luginsfeld Castle, Tuttlingen
 Lupfen Castle, Talheim
 Möhringen Castle, Tuttlingen
 Schloss Möhringen, Tuttlingen
 Schloss Mühlheim, Mühlheim
 Reiffenberg Castle, Trossingen
 Schloss Rietheim, Rietheim Weilheim
 Rockenbusch Castle, Buchheim
 Schallon Castle, Rietheim-Weilheim
 Schwandorf Castle, Neuhausen ob Eck
 Stiegelesfels Castle, Fridingen an der Donau
 Sunthausen Castle, Immendingen
 Wallenburg Castle, Dürbheim
 Wasserburg Castle, Tuttlingen
 Walterstein Castle, Kolbingen
 Wartenberg Castle, Geisingen
 Schloss Wartenberg, Geisingen
 Wehingen Castle, Wehingen
 Ziegelhöhlenburg Castle, Fridingen an der Donau

Landkreis Konstanz 
 Alter Turm Aach, Aach 
 Bodman Castle, Bodman-Ludwigshafen
 Schloss Bodman, Bodman-Ludwigshafen
 Friedinger Schlössle, Singen
 Hohenfels Castle (Hohenfels), Hohenfels 
 Hohenhewen Castle, Engen
 , Mühlhausen-Ehingen
 Honstetten Castle, Eigeltingen
 Hohenstoffeln, Hilzingen
 Hohentwiel Castle, Singen
 Homburg Castle, Radolfzell am Bodensee
 Kargegg Castle, Allensbach
 Mägdeberg Castle, Mühlhausen-Ehingen
 Nellenburg, Stockach
 Neuhewen Castle, Engen
 Tudoburg, Eigeltingen
 Schloss Espasingen (Bodmannsches Schloss), Espasingen
 Möggingen Castle Radolfzell-Möggingen

Landkreis Lörrach 

 Schloss Beuggen, Rheinfelden (Baden)
 Istein Castle (Isteiner Klotz), Efringen-Kirchen
 Inzlinger Wasserschloss, Inzlingen
 Rötteln Castle, Lörrach
 Rotenburg Castle, Wieslet
 Sausenburg Castle, Kandern
 Schloss Bürgeln, Schliengen
 Entenstein Castle, Schliengen
 Stockburg Castle, Malsburg-Marzell

Landkreis Waldshut 
 Gutenburg (Hochrhein), Waldshut-Tiengen
 Hauenstein Castle (Hauenstein), Laufenburg-Hauenstein
 Küssaburg, Küssaberg
 Neu-Tannegg Castle (Boll), Bonndorf
 Rotwasserstelz Castle (also: Schloss Rötteln), Hohentengen am Hochrhein
 Weisswasserstelz Castle, Hohentengen am Hochrhein
 Roggenbach Castle, Bonndorf
 Steinegg Castle, Bonndorf
 Schloss Hohenlupfen, Stühlingen
 Trompeterschlösschen, Bad Säckingen
 Wieladingen Castle, Rickenbach

Regierungsbezirk Tübingen

Landkreis Reutlingen 
 Achalm Castle, Reutlingen
 Alte Burg, Trochtelfingen
 Ruine Alt-Ehrenfels (Ehrenfels), Hayingen
 Altenburg, Reutlingen-Altenburg
 Burg Alt-Lichtenstein (Alter Lichtenstein), Lichtenstein-Honau
 Burg Alt-Hayingen, Hayingen-Indelhausen
 Burg Baach (Bach), Zwiefalten-Baach
 Burg Baldeck, Bad Urach-Wittlingen
 Burg Baldelau, Gomadingen-Wasserstetten
 Burg Bichishausen, Münsingen-Bichishausen
 Burg Blankenhorn, Bad Urach
 Ruine Blankenstein, Gomadingen-Wasserstetten
 Burg Bronnweiler, Reutlingen-Bronnweiler
 Burg Burgstein, Lichtenstein-Unterhausen
 Burg Buttenhausen, Münsingen-Buttenhausen
 Schloss Buttenhausen, Münsingen-Buttenhausen
 Ruine Dapfen, Gomadingen-Marbach
 Burg Derneck (Degeneck), Hayingen
 Schloss Ehestetten, Hayingen-Ehestetten
 Burg Erpfingen, Sonnenbühl-Erpfingen
 Burgrest Fischburg, Bad Urach
 Genkingen Castle (Steinhaus), Sonnenbühl-Genkingen
 Burgstall Genkingen, Sonnenbühl-Genkingen
 Gomadingen Castle, Gomadingen
 Schloss Grafeneck, Gomadingen-Dapfen
 Ruine Greifenstein, Lichtenstein
 Schloss Großengstingen (Prälatenschloss), Engstingen-Großengstingen
 Burg Haideck, Trochtelfingen
 Burg Heidengraben, Grabenstetten
 Heunenburg, Zwiefalten
 Burg Hielock, Trochtelfingen-Mägerkingen
 Burg Hochbiedeck, Lichtenstein
 Ruine Hofen, Grabenstetten
 Burg Hohenenkingen, Sonnenbühl
 Ruine Hohenerpfingen (Erpfingen), Sonnenbühl-Erpfingen
 Burg Hohengenkingen, Sonnenbühl-Genkingen
 Burg Hohengundelfingen, Münsingen
 Burg Hohenhundersingen, Münsingen-Hundersingen
 Burg Hohenstein, Hohenstein
 Hohenurach Castle, Bad Urach
 Burg Hohenwittlingen (Wittlingen), Bad Urach-Wittlingen
 Burg Hohloch, Münsingen
 Burg Hugenberg, Reutlingen-Bronnweiler
 Imenburg, Lichtenstein-Unterhausen
 Lichtenstein Castle, Lichtenstein
 Burg Littstein (Hohenlittstein), Bad Urach
 Ruine Maisenburg, Hayingen-Indelhausen
 Burg Meidelstetten, Hohenstein
 Schloss Münsingen (Altes Schloss), Münsingen
 Schloss Neuehrenfels (Ehrenfels), Hayingen
 Ruine Niedergundelfingen, Münsingen-Gundelfingen
 Ödenburg (Oberstetten), Hohenstein-Oberstetten
 Burg Pfälen, Bad Urach
 Burg Pfullingen (Obere Burg), Pfullingen
 Schloss Pfullingen (Schlössle), Pfullingen
 Jagdschloss Pfullingen (Rempenburg, Untere Burg), Pfullingen
 Burg Reichenau, Münsingen
 Burg Rieder, Zwiefalten-Baach
 Schloss Rübgarten, Pliezhausen-Rübgarten
 Burg Runder Berg, Bad Urach
 Schalggenburg, Wannweil
 Burg Schorren (Venedigerloch), Bad Urach
 Ruine Schülzburg (Schiltenburg), Hayingen-Anhausen
 Burg Seeburg, Bad Urach-Seeburg
 Burg Sonderbuch (Schlossberg), Zwiefalten-Sonderbuch
 Burg Stahleck, Sankt Johann-Ohnastetten
 Burg Steingebronn, Gomadingen-Steingebronn
 Burg Steinhilben, Trochtelfingen-Steinhilben
 Ruine Stöffeln (Stöffelberg, Alte Burg, Alt Stöffeln), Reutlingen-Gönningen
 Burg Trochtelfingen, Trochtelfingen
 Schloss Trochtelfingen (Gröll'sches Schloss), Trochtelfingen
 Wasserschloss Trochtelfingen (Stolch'sches Schloss)), Trochtelfingen
 Unteres Schloss Trochtelfingen, Trochtelfingen
 Schloss Uhenfels, Bad Urach-Seeburg
 Burg Unterhausen (Burgstein), Lichtenstein-Unterhausen
 Burg Unterhausen (Greifenstein), Lichtenstein-Unterhausen
 Schloss Urach, Bad Urach
 Wehrkirche Walddorf, Walddorfhäslach-Walddorf
 Burg Weiler, Hayingen-Münzdorf
 Burg Wildenau, Pliezhausen

Landkreis Tübingen 

 Bebenhausen Abbey and Castle, Tübingen
 Schloss Bühl, Tübingen, Bühl
 Schloss Hirrlingen, Hirrlingen
 Schloss Hohenentringen, Tübingen, Hagelloch (position near Ammerbuch, Entringen)
 Schloss Hohentübingen, Tübingen
 Schloss Kilchberg, Tübingen, Kilchberg
 Burg Müneck, Ammerbuch
 Schloss Poltringen, Ammerbuch, Poltringen
 Schloss Roseck, Unterjesingen
 Schloss Wachendorf, Starzach
 Weilerburg, Weiler
 Schloss Weitenburg, Starzach

Zollernalbkreis 
 Ruine Altentierberg, Lautlingen
 Burg Aufhofen, Burladingen-Stetten-Aufhofen
 Burg Azilun, Burladingen
 Zollernschloss Balingen, Balingen
 Schloss Binsdorf, Geislingen-Binsdorf
 Schloss Bisingen, Bisingen
 Jagdschloss Burladingen, Burladingen
 Ruine Burladingen (Hochwacht), Burladingen
 Burg Dotternhausen, Dotternhausen
 Schloss Dotternhausen, Dotternhausen
 Burg Ebingen (Nellenburg), Albstadt-Ebingen
 Ruine Ehestetten (Taubenfels), Albstadt-Ebingen
 Burg Endingen, Balingen-Endingen
 Villa Eugenia, Hechingen
 Ruine Falken (Gottfriedfelsen), Burladingen
 Frundsburg (Frundsbürgle, Eineck), Burladingen-Ringingen
 Geislingen Castle, Geislingen
 Wasserburg Geislingen, Geislingen
 Wasserschloss Geislingen (Unteres Schloss), Geislingen
 Burg Gräbelesberg, Albstadt-Laufen an der Eyach
 Schloss Grosselfingen, Grosselfingen
 Schloss Gruol (Wasserschlössle), Haigerloch
 Burg Haigerloch (Römerturm), Haigerloch
 Schloss Haigerloch, Haigerloch
 Haagschlößchen, Haigerloch
 Schlößle Haigerloch (Untere Burg), Haigerloch
 Ruine Haimburg (Homburg, Homberg, Hainburg), Grosselfingen
 Burg Haiterbach (Schlossberg), Meßstetten
 Burg Häringstein (Ebinger Schlossfels), Albstadt-Ebingen
 Ruine Hasenfratz (Fratzenhas), Burladingen-Gauselfingen
 Burg Hausen (Burg am Heubelstein), Albstadt-Margrethausen
 Burg Hausen (Burzel), Hausen am Tann
 Altes Schloss Hechingen, Hechingen
 Neues Schloss Hechingen (Friedrichsburg), Hechingen
 Burg Heersberg, Albstadt
 Burg Heidenschlößle (Hausen, Weilen unter den Rinnen), Weilen unter den Rinnen
 Burg Hinterwiesen, Balingen-Streichen
 Burg Hirschberg, Balingen
 Hochburg, Rangendingen
 Ruine Hohenjungingen (Jungingen, Affenschmalz), Jungingen
 Ruine Hohenmelchingen (Melchingen), Burladingen-Melchingen
 Burg Hohenrangendingen, Rangendingen
 Ruine Hohenringingen, Burladingen-Ringingen
 Hohenzollern Castle, Bisingen
 Ruine Holstein (Höllstein, Hölnstein), Burladingen-Stetten
 Burg Hossingen (Hossenburg), Meßstetten-Hossingen
 Burg Isnegg, Hechingen-Weilheim
 Ruine Kapf, Burladingen
 Ruine Leckstein (Lagstein), Burladingen-Gauselfingen
 Schloss Lindich, Hechingen
 Burg Melchingen, Burladingen-Melchingen
 Burg Meßstetten, Meßstetten
 Ruine Nähberg, Burladingen
 Burg Oberdigisheim, Meßstetten-Oberdigisheim
 Schloss Oberhausen (Winzeln), Hausen am Tann
 Burg Oberhohenberg (Hohenberg), Schömberg-Schörzingen
 Burg Obernheim (Burgbühl), Obernheim
 Burg Plettenberg (Plaikten), Dotternhausen
 Ruine Ringelstein (Ringingen, Aloisschlößle), Burladingen-Ringingen
 Burg Rohr, Bisingen
 Ruine Ror, Bisingen
 Burg Rosenfeld, Rosenfeld
 Burg Rosswangen, Balingen-Rosswangen
 Ruine Salmendingen, Burladingen-Salmendingen
 Schalksburg, Straßberg
 Schalksburg, Albstadt-Laufen an der Eyach
 Burg Semdach, Hechingen-Boll
 Burg Stauffenberg, Hechingen
 Schloss Stauffenberg (Stauffenberg, Staufenberg), Albstadt-Lautlingen
 Ruine Stetten (Holstein, Hölnstein), Burladingen-Stetten unter Holstein
 Burg Straßberg, Straßberg
 Schloss Straßberg (Neues Schloss), Straßberg
 Burg Streichen, Balingen-Streichen
 Burg Tailfingen (Tailfinger Schloss), Albstadt-Tailfingen
 Burg Tieringen, Meßstetten-Tieringen
 Burg Vogelfels, Albstadt
 Volksburg (Stein), Hechingen-Stein
 Weilerburg (Weilersburg, Niederhohenberg, Rotenburg), Albstadt-Tailfingen
 Wehrkirche Weilheim (Mariä Heimsuchung), Hechingen-Weilheim
 Ruine Wenzelstein (Winzeln), Hausen am Tann
 Burg Wildentierberg, Albstadt-Margrethausen
 Burg Zell, Hechingen-Boll
 Bürgle, Zimmern unter der Burg

Ulm 
 Schloss Böfingen
 Schloss Obertalfingen

Alb-Donau-Kreis 

 Albeck Castle, Langenau-Albeck
 Allmendingen Castle, Allmendingen
 Altenberg Castle, Dietenheim
 Altheim Castle, Altheim near Ehingen
 Altsteußlingen Castle, Ehingen
 Arnegg Castle, Blaustein
 Asselfingen Castle, Rammingen-Asselfingen
 Bach Castle, Erbach-Bach
 Berg Castle, Ehingen
 Berkach Castle, Ehingen
 Bernstadt Castle, Bernstadt
 Blauenstein Castle, Blaubeuren
 Blaustein Castle, Blaubeuren
 Bollingen Castle, Dornstadt-Bollingen
 Brandenburg Castle, Dietenheim
 Breitenbühl, Bernstadt
 Schlössle Breitingen, Breitingen
 Briel Castle, Ehingen (Donau)
 Dellmensingen Castle, Erbach an der Donau
 Schloss Emerkingen, Emerkingen
 Erbach Castle, Erbach
 Schloss Gamerschwang, Ehingen (Donau)
 Gleißenburg Castle, Blaubeuren
 Schloss Granheim, Ehingen (Donau)
 Günzelburg Castle, Blaubeuren
 Hohenschelklingen Castle, Schelklingen
 Jörgenberg Castle, Rechtenstein
 Justingen Castle, Ehingen (Donau)
 Klingenstein Castle, Blaustein
 Schloss Mochental, Ehingen (Donau)
 Monsberg Castle, Ehingen (Donau)
 Muschenwang Castle, Schelklingen
 Neidegg Castle, Blaustein
 Schloss Neusteußlingen, Ehingen (Donau)
 Oberes Schloss Oberbalzheim, Balzheim
 Unteres Schloss Oberbalzheim, Balzheim
 Schloss Oberdischingen, Oberdischingen
 Schloss Oberherrlingen, Blaustein
 Schloss Oberkirchberg, Illerkirchberg
 Rechtenstein Castle, Rechtenstein
 Reichenstein Castle, Lauterach
 Schloss Rißtissen, Ehingen (Donau)
 St. Ruprecht Castle, Ehingen (Donau)
 Rusenschloss Castle, Blaubeuren
 Sirgenstein Castle, Blaubeuren
 Wartstein, Ehingen (Donau)

Landkreis Biberach 
 Achstetten Castle, Achstetten
 Alberweiler Castle, Schemmerhofen
 Bachritterburg Kanzach, Kanzach
 Bussen, Uttenweiler
 Großlaupheim Castle, Laupheim
 Hassenberg Castle, Riedlingen
 Kleinlaupheim Castle, Laupheim
 Obersulmetingen Castle, Laupheim - Obersulmetingen
 Orsenhausen Castle, Schwendi-Orsenhausen
 Ummendorf Castle, Ummendorf
 Untersulmetingen Castle, Laupheim - Untersulmetingen
 Wain Castle, Wain
 Warthausen Castle, Warthausen
 Winterstetten Castle, Winterstettenstadt
 Zwiefaltendorf Castle, Riedlingen

Bodenseekreis 
 Schloss Friedrichshafen, Friedrichshafen
 Schloss Heiligenberg, Heiligenberg
 Schloss Maurach, Uhldingen-Mühlhofen
 Burg Meersburg, Meersburg
 Neues Schloss Meersburg, Meersburg
 Schloss Salem, Salem
 Tettnang New Castle, Tettnang

Landkreis Ravensburg 
 Schloss Achberg, Achberg
 Schloss Altshausen, Altshausen
 Schloss Aulendorf, Aulendorf
 Schloss Benzenhofen, Berg
 Burg Hatzenturm, Wolpertswende
 Altes Schloss Kißlegg, Kißlegg
 Neues Schloss Kißlegg, Kißlegg
 Burg Königsegg, Guggenhausen
 Schloss Königseggwald, Königseggwald
 Burg Neuravensburg, Wangen im Allgäu
 Burgruine Marstetten, Aitrach
 Veitsburg, Ravensburg
 Waldburg, Waldburg
 Schloss Waldsee, Bad Waldsee
 Schloss Wolfegg, Wolfegg
 Schloss Wurzach, Bad Wurzach

Landkreis Sigmaringen 
 Affelstetten Castle, Veringenstadt-Veringendorf
 Altes Schloss (Gammertingen), Gammertingen
 Altgutenstein (Burgfelden), Sigmaringen-Gutenstein
 Altwildenstein (Vorderwildenstein), Leibertingen
 Auchtbühl Castle, Beuron-Neidlingen
 Ruine Baldenstein, Gammertingen
 Schloss Bartelstein, Scheer
 Baumburg (Hundersingen) (Buwenburg), Herbertingen-Hundersingen
 Ruine Benzenberg (Benzenburg), Meßkirch-Rohrdorf
 Burgstall Bittelschieß, Krauchenwies-Bittelschieß
 Ruine Bittelschieß, Bingen-Hornstein
 Boll Castle, Sauldorf-Boll
 Schloss Bronnen, Gammertingen-Bronnen
 Bürgle (Heudorf), Scheer-Heudorf
 Ruine Burgweiler, Ostrach-Burgweiler
 Burrach Castle, Wald (Hohenzollern)
 Ruine Dietfurt, Inzigkofen-Dietfurt
 Ruine Eppenburg, Stetten am kalten Markt-Frohnstetten
 Burg Falkenstein (Donautal), Beuron
 Fallfelsenhöhle, Beuron
 Friedberg Castle (Bad Saulgau), Bad Saulgau-Friedberg
 Gebrochen Gutenstein (Neugutenstein, Niedergutenstein), Sigmaringen-Gutenstein
 Schloss Gutenstein, Sigmaringen-Gutenstein
 Hahnenkamm, Leibertingen
 Schloss Hausen, Beuron-Hausen im Tal
 Heggelbach Castle, Herdwangen-Schönach-Oberndorf
 Ruine Hertenstein, Sigmaringen
 Schloss Hettingen, Hettingen
 Hexenturm, Leibertingen
 Hinterlichtenstein Castle, Neufra
 Hornstein Castle, Bingen 
 Hustneck Castle, Gammertingen
 Schloss Inzigkofen, Inzigkofen
 Burg Isikofen, Sigmaringen-Jungnau
 Josefslust Hunting Lodge, Sigmaringen-Josefslust
 Jungnau Castle, Sigmaringen-Jungnau
 Schloss Krauchenwies (Landhaus), Krauchenwies
 Krauchenwies (Altes Schloss, Wasserhaus), Krauchenwies
 Kreidenstein Castle, Beuron
 Lägelen (Wagenburg), Beuron-Hausen im Tal
 Langenfels Castle, Beuron
 Leibertingen (Bei der Burg), Leibertingen
 Lengenfeld Castle, Beuron-Hausen im Tal
 Lenzenberg (Lenzenburg, Langenfels), Beuron-Hausen im Tal
 Wasserschloss Menningen, Meßkirch-Menningen
 Meßkirch Castle, Meßkirch
 Neidinger Heidenschloss (Jagberg, Heidenschloss), Beuron-Neidingen
 Neues Schloss (Gammertingen), Gammertingen
 Burgruine Neugutenstein, Sigmaringen
 Oberfalkenstein Castle, Beuron
 Petershöhle, Beuron
 Pfannenstiel Castle, Beuron
 Ramsberg Castle, Großschönach
 Schauenburg, Stetten am kalten Markt
 Schloss Scheer, Scheer
 Schiltau Castle, Sigmaringen-Jungnau
 Schmeien Castle, Sigmaringen-Oberschmeien
 Sigmaringen Castle, Sigmaringen
 Sigmaringendorf Castle, Sigmaringendorf
 Schloss Sigmaringendorf (Ratzenhofer Schlösschen), Sigmaringendorf
 Spaltfels, Beuron
 Schloss Stetten, Stetten am kalten Markt
 Storzinger Schlössle, Stetten am kalten Markt-Storzingen
 Unterfalkenstein, Beuron-Thiergarten
 Unterwildenstein, Leibertingen
 Utkoven (Nickhof), Inzigkofen
 Veringen Castle, Veringenstadt-Veringendorf
 Vorderlichtenstein Castle (Bubenhofen), Neufra
 Waldsberg (Krumbach), Sauldorf-Krumbach
 Weckenstein (Heidenschloss), Stetten am kalten Markt-Storzingen
 Weiler (Heidenloch), Beuron-Thiergarten
 Schloss Werenwag, Beuron
 Wildenstein Castle, Leibertingen

See also
List of castles
List of castles in Germany

References

 
Baden-Württemberg
Cast